This is a list of fantasy comics, consisting of comics whose fantasy content comprise a significant portion of the total content.

Comic books

 A Game of Thrones
 Advanced Dungeons & Dragons
 Amethyst, Princess of Gemworld
 Arak, Son of Thunder
 Arion, Lord of Atlantis
 Arrowsmith
 Artesia
 Atlas
 Battle Chasers
 Beowulf
 Bone
 The Books of Magic
 Brath
 Camelot 3000
 Castle Waiting
 Cavewoman
 Cerebus the Aardvark
 The Chronicles of Corum
 Claw the Unconquered
 Conan (Marvel)
 Conan (Dark Horse)
 Conan the Adventurer
 Conan the Barbarian
 The Dark Tower
 Dark Wraith of Shannara
 Death Dealer
 Demon Knights
 The DemonWars Saga
 Dragonlance
 Dragonslayer
 The Dreaming 
 Dungeon
 Dungeon Siege: The Battle for Aranna
 Dungeons & Dragons
 El Mercenario
 Elfquest
 Elric
 Epic Illustrated
 Fables
 Fafhrd and the Gray Mouser
 Finieous Fingers
 Forge of War
 Forgotten Realms
 Gargoyles
 God Is Dead
 God of War (DC Comics)
 God of War (Dark Horse Comics)
 Graphic Myths and Legends
 Grimm Fairy Tales
 Groo the Wanderer
 He-Man and the Masters of the Universe
 Heavy Metal
 The History of the Runestaff
 The Hobbit
 Ironwood
 Kill Shakespeare
 Kull of Atlantis
 Lady Death
 Little Nemo in Slumberland
 Meridian
 Michael Moorcock's Multiverse
 Monster Allergy
 Mouse Guard
 Mystic
 The New Brighton Archeological Society
 Orcs: Forged for War
 Poison Elves
 Prince Valiant
 Purgatori
 Rat Queens
 Record of the Lodoss War
 Red Sonja
 Redwall
 Rokkin
 The Saga of Crystar
 Sandman
 Savage Sword of Conan
 Savage Tales
 Scion
 Sisterhood of Steel
 Sláine
 Sleepless
 The Smurfs
 Sojourn
 Solomon Kane
 Spelljammer
 Stalker
 Starchild
 Starfire
 Sword of Sorcery
 The Swords of Heaven, the Flowers of Hell
 Tarot: Witch of the Black Rose
 Tellos
 Thorgal
 Thrud the Barbarian
 Tor
 Valda the Iron Maiden
 Vampirella
 Warlord
 Weirdworld
 The Wicked + The Divine
 W.I.T.C.H.
 Wolfskin
 World of Warcraft
 Wormy
 Xena: Warrior Princess

Webcomics
 Basileus
 Cucumber Quest
 Digger
 The Dreamland Chronicles
 Earthsong
 Elf Life
 Goblins
 Gunnerkrigg Court
 Inverloch
 The Meek
 Nimona
 Order of the Stick
 The Phoenix Requiem
 Pibgorn
 Rogues of Clwyd-Rhan

References

Fantasy